Gordon Ford (1918–1999) was an Australian landscape designer who created rugged gardens which were noted to be of a distinctly Australian style.

After returning from service in New Guinea in WWII, he settled near Montsalvat, where he dug out a site and built a house made out of mud bricks from the clay.

Ford worked closely with British architect Alistair Knox. He trained as a landscape gardener with Ellis Stones.

In the last years of his life he trained landscape designer Sam Cox.

Books
 Gordon Ford: The Natural Australian Garden, Gordon & Gwen Ford (Bloomings Books)
 Australian Garden Design, Ellis Stones (Macmillan)
 Capability Brown, Dorothy Shroud (Faber)

References

Australian landscape architects
1918 births
1999 deaths
Australian Army personnel of World War II
20th-century Australian architects
Australian Army soldiers